Richard Dresser (born 1951) is an American playwright, screenwriter, novelist and teacher whose work has been performed in New York, leading regional theaters, and all over Europe. His first dystopian fiction novel, It Happened Here, an oral history of an American family from the years 2019 to 2035, dealing with life in a totalitarian state when you still have Netflix and two-day free shipping and all you've lost is your freedom, was released in October 2020 . He is co-producing a documentary about Daniel and Phillip Berrigan, antiwar priests and lifelong activists.

Personal life and early career
Dresser was raised in central Massachusetts,  where he was captain of the high school hockey team and catcher on the varsity baseball team. He graduated from Brown University in 1973. In his early twenties he worked a variety of jobs ranging from machine operator in a plastics factory to security guard to local radio news reporter in Pittsfield, Massachusetts. This motivated him to get a graduate degree in communications at the University of North Carolina at Chapel Hill, where he was Program Director at the local NPR station. He took a life-changing course in dramatic writing which led him to write his first play, which won a college playwriting competition and started him on his way as a playwright.

Before finding success as a playwright, he did freelance writing for corporate speeches and wrote industrial films, many for pharmaceutical companies. He credits his early career experiences in factories and the corporate world with inspiring his workplace comedies, The Downside and Below the Belt (set in a pharmaceutical company and a manufacturing plant, respectively).

Dresser lived in New York until 1992, when he moved to Los Angeles with his wife, Rebecca, and son, Sam, to work in television. He and his family moved to Hastings-on-Hudson, New York, in 2000.

Playwriting
Since his early career, Dresser has been unusually prolific.  His seventeen published plays;  three musicals, and various shorter plays have been performed all over the country. Venues that have hosted regional, national or world premieres of his work include the Humana Festival in at Actors Theater of Louisville, the Contemporary American Theatre Festival (CATF) in Shepherdstown, West Virginia; the Laguna Playhouse in Laguna Beach, California, and the Merrimack Repertory Theater in Lowell, Massachusetts He has developed plays at the Eugene O'Neill Playwrights Conference  in Connecticut, The Denver Center's New Play Summit, and The  PlayPenn New Play Conference in Philadelphia.

Among his notable early works were Better Days (which premiered in April 1987 at the Philadelphia Festival Theatre for New Plays) and The Downside (which premiered in November 1987 at the Long Wharf Theater in New Haven, Connecticut). In 1995, Dresser's Below the Belt premiered at the Humana Festival, followed by a 1996 Off-Broadway production named by the Wall Street Journal as the "best new American play of the season." Since its debut, Below the Belt has found especially high popularity all over Europe, including over 50 productions in Germany alone. Below the Belt, along with a number of his other plays, have been produced at the Schaubuhne Theatre in Berlin under the direction of Thomas Ostermeier. The play was later filmed as Human Error, directed by Robert M. Young. It appeared at the Sundance Film Festival.

His most successful play in the United States is Rounding Third, a 2002 two-character comedy about two Little League coaches, which was workshopped at CATF in 2001 before its 2002 premiere in Chicago. In 2003, the play was performed at San Diego's Old Globe Theater and the Laguna Playhouse before an off-Broadway run and a return to CATF in 2004. It was later made into the film Benched.

Kevin Kelly of the Boston Globe called Dresser "a ferocious playwright...who writes with a headlong intensity and a sense of pervasive mystery."

The LA Times said, "Dresser's dialogue crackles like gunfire in a shooting gallery."

John Simon in New York Magazine said, "Below the Belt is a terribly serious play that keeps you steadily laughing; properly understood, it should also make you weep."

More recent plays include The Last Days of Mickey & Jean, about an aging gangster on the run with his longtime girlfriend. It premiered at Merrimack Repertory Theatre and later at Penguin Rep. Trouble Cometh, a comic thriller about two executives locked in an existential struggle against an impossible deadline to create a reality TV show premiered at San Francisco Playhouse in  2015.

Musicals
Dresser wrote the book for the Beach Boys Broadway musical Good Vibrations. After development at New York Stage and Film in Poughkeepsie, New York, the play opened at the Eugene O'Neill Theatre in February and closed in April after 94 performances. Dresser wrote the book for the original musical, Johnny Baseball, about the Curse of the Red Sox, with lyrics by Willie Reale and music by his brother Rob. It premiered at the American Repertory Theatre in Cambridge, Massachusetts in the spring of 2010, under the direction of Diane Paulus. It later played the Williamstown Theatre Festival. The Holler, a bluegrass ghost musical, appeared at the Williamstown Theatre Festival, also with lyrics by Willie Reale and music by Rob Reale.

Television
Dresser was writer/producer for the 1987-1991 comedy-drama The Days and Nights of Molly Dodd, created by Jay Tarses. Dresser went on to work on a number of other shows, including Tarses's comedy Smoldering Lust (retitled Black Tie Affair) and such cult classics as Bakersfield PD, The Job, and others which weren't so classic. He has written pilots for all the networks.

Other activities
Dresser has taught screenwriting at Columbia University since 2015, following a stint teaching television writing at Rutgers.

In 2008, Dresser was one of the founders of the Writers Guild Initiative, along with Tom Fontana, Michael Weller, Lulie Haddad, Jim Hart, and John Markus. Operating under the umbrella of the Writers Guild of America, East, the Initiative's mission is to give a voice to populations not being heard, through writing workshops all over the country, including veterans, caregivers, wounded soldiers, exonerated death row prisoners, DACA recipients, LGBTQ asylum seekers, inmates at the Pendleton Prison in Indiana, victims of Hurricane Sandy, people living with HIV/AIDS, people living with chronic illness, and, more recently, nurses, paramedics and other first line responders in New York. Dresser is a frequent mentor in these workshops and is currently President of the Writers Guild Initiative.

In 2009, Dresser delivered the commencement address at Shepherd University in Shepherdstown, West Virginia, which hosts CATF every summer. Dresser told graduates that in the current state of the world, "A lot of things need fixing and there are a lot of people who need help. We need you, your talent, energy and optimism." He warned them that "there are no safe choices." Dresser also received an honorary degree from the university.

Filmography
 Human Error  (screenwriter)
 Benched (2018) - Screenwriter

List of plays

References

American dramatists and playwrights
American musical theatre librettists
Living people
American male screenwriters
American male dramatists and playwrights
1951 births